The 1970–71 season was Mansfield Town's 34th season in the Football League and 10th in the Third Division, they finished in 7th position with 51 points.

Final league table

Results

Football League Third Division

FA Cup

League Cup

Squad statistics
 Squad list sourced from

Notes

References
General
 Mansfield Town 1970–71 at soccerbase.com (use drop down list to select relevant season)

Specific

Mansfield Town F.C. seasons
Mansfield Town